Traupis is a town in Anykščiai district municipality, in Utena County, in northeast Lithuania. According to the 2011 census, the town has a population of 179 people. Town established near Nevėžis River.

Gallery

Education
Traupis primary school

References

External links
Official website

Towns in Utena County
Towns in Lithuania
Vilkomirsky Uyezd
Anykščiai District Municipality